Cleyton Alexandre Henrique Silva (born 8 March 1983) is a Brazilian former professional footballer who played as an attacking midfielder.

Career
Cleyton is one of few footballers in Greece to have a dual passport, one of Brazilian and one of Greek which he received on 13 November 2009, after spending 7 years in Greece, making him eligible to gain Greek citizenship. On 19 September 2004 he made his debut in the Super League Greece in a 1–0 home of his club (Apollon Kalamarias) win against OFI Crete.

AEL
In the 2006–07 season he helped AEL reach the Greek cup final and win it. He was the club's top scorer in European competitions in the 2007/08 season, including goals against Blackburn Rovers and Everton.

Panathinaikos
Cleyton signed for Panathinaikos in the summer of 2008 for a fee of €1,700,000. Since then he has scored 5 goals for the greens, one being a fantastic overhead kick against his former club AEL.
Cleyton Start the 2011–2012 season well, by scoring very important goals for the greens such as a direct free kick against PAOK and a fantastic overhead kick against Levadiakos.

Dinamo Zagreb
On 22 January 2014, Cleyton signed for Dinamo Zagreb after his former Kayserispor manager Robert Prosinečki recommended him to the club.  On 28 March 2014, it was reported by the club that the two parties had mutually agreed to terminate the player's contract as a result of misconduct not tolerated by the club. Croatian media reported that Cleyton provoked and engaged in a fight at a Zagreb night club in the early morning hours of 27 March 2014 while heavily under the influence of alcohol.

Skoda Xanthi
On 2 September 2014, Cleyton signs a year contract for Xanthi for an undisclosed fee. On 20 September 2014, he made his debut with the club in a 2–0 home win against Levadiakos.

On April 29, 2015 Xanthi succeeded to reach the Greek Cup final for the first time in its history after a 0–0 draw with Iraklis. Cleyton Silva has twice won the Greek Cup, one with AEL in 2007 and one with Panathinaikos in 2010, but by his words seemed to have the same mood for the title. "The feeling is always wonderful, but it is more difficult when a small team from the province, succeeds to reach a final. It is by far a greater success. Panathinaikos, is rather usual to go to the final and win the Cup, but for clubs like AEL and Skoda Xanthi, is something different." Concluding he stated also "And in 2007 when I played for AEL, Panathinaikos was the favorite. The same scenario is in front of us with Olympiakos. This is a fight. We're going to give everything, to play first of all for ourselves and our families and will see what happens. Frankly speaking, the mood in the club is not easily found either in Greece or abroad. That's the main reason for our success."

On 3 May 2015 in a 0–0 home draw against Asteras Tripoli where he lost a penalty Cleyton reached 200 appearances in Greek Super League.

Elazığspor & Göztepe
On 7 August 2015, despite numerous offer from Greek clubs, Cleyton decided to continue his career in Turkey signing a two years' contract for TFF First League club Elazığspor for an undisclosed fee. Due to financial problems, and after the first half of the season, Cleyton decided to return to Greece to play for Iraklis, that seemed to be the proper club to continue his career.

Cleyton, who was a transfer target of Atromitos and Iraklis, chose to remain in Turkey and continue his career at Göztepe. The 33-year-old former player of Panathinaikos was then released by Elazigspor, but selected not to return in Greece, where he has spent the biggest part of his career.

Omonia Nicosia
On 18 June 2016, he signed a contract with Cypriot club Omonia Nicosia. He appeared in 41 games and scored 10 goals. On 26 May 2017 the club announced that Cleyton was released under a mutual agreement with the footballer.

Return to Turkey
On 5 July 2017, he signed a year contract with TFF First League club Ümraniyespor for an undisclosed fee.

Iraklis
On 7 September 2018, he joined Iraklis of the Football League on a free transfer.

Career statistics

Club

Honours

Club
AEL
Greek Cup: 2006–07

Panathinaikos
Super League Greece: 2009–10
Greek Cup: 2009–10
Xanthi
Greek Cup runner-up: 2014–15

Individual
Super League Greece Team of the Year: 2014–15

References

External links
 
ІСТОРІЯ ТА СТАТИСТИКА УКРАЇНСЬКОГО ФУТБОЛУ на ukr-football.org.ua

1983 births
Living people
Association football midfielders
Brazilian footballers
Greek footballers
Greek people of Brazilian descent
Apollon Pontou FC players
Athlitiki Enosi Larissa F.C. players
Panathinaikos F.C. players
Iraklis Thessaloniki F.C. players
FC Metalurh Donetsk players
Kayserispor footballers
GNK Dinamo Zagreb players
Ümraniyespor footballers
Brazilian expatriate footballers
Expatriate footballers in Greece
Expatriate footballers in Ukraine
Expatriate footballers in Turkey
Expatriate footballers in Croatia
AC Omonia players
Cypriot First Division players
Greek expatriate footballers
Brazilian expatriate sportspeople in Greece
Brazilian expatriate sportspeople in Ukraine
Brazilian expatriate sportspeople in Turkey
Super League Greece players
Super League Greece 2 players
Ukrainian Premier League players
Süper Lig players
TFF First League players
Croatian Football League players
Footballers from São Paulo (state)